Vuela El Salvador S.A. de C.V. operating as Volaris El Salvador, is a low-cost airline based in San Salvador. It is a subsidiary of Mexican airline Volaris and a local flag carrier for El Salvador.

History
The airline had its first certification flight on August 20, 2019, between the cities of San Salvador, Guatemala City and Guadalajara.

Destinations

Fleet
As of March 2023, Volaris El Salvador currently flies the following aircraft:

See also
List of airlines of El Salvador
List of low-cost airlines

References

Airlines established in 2019
Airlines of El Salvador
Low-cost carriers
2019 establishments in El Salvador